The Warswai is a river in northern Southwest Papua province, Indonesia. It flows in Tambrauw Regency and discharges into the Pacific Ocean.

See also
List of rivers of Indonesia
List of rivers of Western New Guinea

References

Rivers of Southwest Papua 
Rivers of Indonesia